180 astetta (translation: 180 degrees) is the eighth studio album by the Finnish thrash metal band Mokoma. The album was released through Sakara Records on October 19, 2012, and was produced by Miitri Aaltonen in addition to the band itself. The album peaked on the top position of The Official Finnish Charts.

Track listings

Personnel
 Kuisma Aalto – guitar, backing vocals
 Marko Annala – vocals
 Janne Hyrkäs – drums, percussion
 Santtu Hämäläinen – bass, additional guitar
 Tuomo Saikkonen – guitar, backing vocals, percussion

References 

2012 albums
Mokoma albums